Forest Home is a former settlement in Amador County, California. It still appeared on USGS maps as of 1944.

Forest Home began as a gold mining center, north of Ione. Both placer and hydraulic mining was conducted. After the gold petered out, copper mining began.

A post office operated at Forest Home from 1862 to 1905, moving once in 1886.

References

Former settlements in Amador County, California
Former populated places in California
1862 establishments in California